This is a list of electoral results for the Electoral district of East Perth in Western Australian state elections.

Members for East Perth

Election results

Elections in the 1950s

Elections in the 1940s

 Preferences were not distributed.

 Preferences were not distributed.

Elections in the 1930s

 This by-election was caused by the sitting member Thomas Hughes being declared bankrupt, and had to resign his seat. He settled his finances and was able to re-contest the seat in the by-election.

 Preferences were not distributed.

Elections in the 1920s

 Preferences were not distributed.

 This by-election was caused by the resignation of sitting member Jack Simons after he changed to the Nationalists. He did not retain the seat.

Elections in the 1910s

Elections in the 1900s

Elections in the 1890s

References

Western Australian state electoral results by district